Sumon Barua is a first-class and List A cricketer from Bangladesh.  A right-handed batsman and right arm medium fast bowler, he played for Chittagong Division in 2001/02. His only first-class match was not a success but in five limited overs games he took a best of 3 for 57 against Dhaka Metropolis and scored 20 runs against the same team.

References

Bangladeshi cricketers
Chittagong Division cricketers
Living people
Year of birth missing (living people)
Bangladeshi Buddhists